Saint Flavia is a saint of the Roman Catholic Church. She was martyred at Messina along with her brother, the Benedictine monk Saint Placidus, their brothers Eutychius and Victorinus, Donatus, Firmatus the deacon, Faustus, and thirty other monks. They were killed by pirates. Their feast day is October 15. Saint Flavia was from Paleramo Sicily. In Paleramo there is a part called Santa Flavia after her.

Notes

Christian saints in unknown century
Medieval Italian saints
People killed by pirates
Year of birth unknown